Eugênio Maciel German (24 October 1930 – 1 April 2001) was a Brazilian International chess master.

German was born in Ubá, Brazil. In 1949, Eugênio German won a match against Jayme Schreibman Moses in Belo Horizonte (+2 –1 =1). In 1949, he tied for 3rd-4th in Rio de Janeiro (17th BRA-ch; Walter Cruz won). In 1950, he tied for 5-6th in Rio de Janeiro (18th BRA-ch; Jose Thiago Mangini won). In 1951, he won the Brazilian Chess Championship in Fortaleza (19th BRA-ch). In 1951/52, he took 4th in San Rafael (Erich Eliskases won). In 1952, he tied for 7-8th in Mar del Plata (Julio Bolbochán and Héctor Rossetto won). In 1952, he tied for 2nd-3rd, behind Flavio de Carvalho Jr, in São Paulo (20th BRA-ch).

In 1960, he won in Belo Horizonte (pre-zonal). In 1960, he tied for 3rd-5th in São Paulo (zonal; Julio Bolbochán won). In 1961, he won, ahead of Rodrigo Flores and Bernardo Wexler, in São Paulo (zonal playoff). In 1962, he tied for 19-20th in the Stockholm Interzonal. In 1963, he won in Belo Horizonte. In 1965, he won in Belo Horizonte. In 1972, he won in Blumenau (39th BRA-ch).

Eugenio German played for Brazil in three Chess Olympiads.
 In 1952, at first board in the 10th Chess Olympiad in Helsinki (+6 –2 =3);
 In 1968, at second board in the 18th Chess Olympiad in Lugano (+5 –7 =3);
 In 1972, at first board in the 20th Chess Olympiad in Skopje (+8 –4 =8).

Awarded the International Master title in 1952, he was first Brazilian to be made an IM by FIDE.

References

External links

1930 births
2001 deaths
Brazilian chess players
Chess International Masters
Chess Olympiad competitors
People from Minas Gerais
20th-century chess players